The Satyendra K. Dubey Memorial Award is an award named after Satyendra Dubey and presented by the IIT-Kanpur. It is awarded annually to an IIT alumnus who displays the highest levels of professional integrity in upholding human values. The Memorial Award was instituted by IIT Kanpur in 2005 in memory of Satyendra K. Dubey  and his exemplary life and supreme sacrifice.

Eligibility
Any alumnus of any IIT who has distinguished him or herself by displaying the highest professional integrity in upholding human values is eligible for the Satyendra K. Dubey Memorial Award.

Awardees

References

Awards established in 2005